Bushton is an unincorporated community in Morgan Township, Coles County, Illinois, United States.

Geography

See also
 List of unincorporated communities in Illinois

References

Unincorporated communities in Coles County, Illinois
Unincorporated communities in Illinois